The 1988 Vitosha New Otani Open was a women's tennis tournament played on outdoor hard courts in Sofia, Bulgaria and was part of the Category 2 tier of the 1988 WTA Tour. The tournament ran from 8 August until 14 August 1988. Sixth-seeded Conchita Martínez won the singles title and earned $17,000 first-prize money.

Finals

Singles

 Conchita Martínez defeated  Barbara Paulus 6–1, 6–2
 It was Martínez's 1st title of the year and the 1st of her career.

Doubles

 Conchita Martínez /  Barbara Paulus defeated  Sabrina Goleš /  Katerina Maleeva 1–6, 6–1, 6–4
 It was Martínez's 2nd title of the year and the 2nd of her career. It was Paulus' 2nd title of the year and the 2nd of her career.

References

External links
 ITF tournament edition details
 Tournament draws

Vitosha New Otani Open
Vitosha New Otani Open
1988 in Bulgarian tennis
1988 in Bulgarian women's sport